Dorothy Short (June 29, 1915 – June 4, 1963) was an American film actress, mainly in low-budget Westerns and serials in the 1930s and 1940s.

A native of Philadelphia, Short was the daughter of Mrs. E. M. Short. She began working in films for Metro-Goldwyn-Mayer in 1933 on a trial basis. In November 1933, a court in California approved a seven-year contract, with options, between the 18-year-old actress and the studio.

Short married actor Dave O'Brien in 1936, the same year they appeared together in the low-budget exploitation cheapie Reefer Madness, which in modern times has become a well-known cult film. She also appeared in another anti-marijuana film, Assassin of Youth, in 1937.

She often appeared alongside her husband in various 'B' pictures and the Pete Smith series of comedy shorts, in which O'Brien played the lead on many occasions during the 1940s. After their divorce in 1954, Short retired from film acting, and died nine years later at age 47.

Selected filmography
The Call of the Savage (1935) as Mona Andreas
Reefer Madness (1936) as  Mary
 Damaged Goods (1937) as Table Dancer
Brothers of the West (1937) as Annie Wade
Assassin of Youth (1938) as Marjorie 'Marge' Barry
Heart of Arizona (1938) as Jacqueline  'Jackie' Starr
The Singing Cowgirl (1938) as Nora Pryde
Where the Buffalo Roam (1938) as Laddie Gray
Wild Horse Canyon (1938) as Jean Hall
Code of the Cactus (1939) as Joan
Daughter of the Tong (1939) as Marion Morgan
Phantom Rancher (1940) as Ann Markham
 Frontier Crusader (1940) as Jenny Mason
Pony Post (1940) as Alice Goodwin
Trail of the Silver Spurs (1941) as Nancy Nordick
 Buzzy and the Phantom Pinto (1941) as Ruth Wade
Spooks Run Wild (1941) as Linda Mason
The Lone Rider Fights Back (1941) as Jean Dennison
 Bullets for Bandits (1942) as Dakota Brown
Captain Midnight (1942) as Joyce Edwards

References

External links
 
 

1915 births
1963 deaths
American film actresses
Film serial actresses
20th-century American actresses
Western (genre) film actresses